9-1-1 is an American procedural drama television series created by Ryan Murphy, Brad Falchuk and Tim Minear for the Fox Broadcasting Company. The series follows the lives of Los Angeles first responders: police officers, paramedics, firefighters and dispatchers. The series premiered on January 3, 2018. 9-1-1 is a joint production between Reamworks, Ryan Murphy Television, and 20th Television.

 On May 16, 2022, Fox renewed the series for a sixth season which premiered on September 19, 2022.

Series overview

Episodes

Season 1 (2018)

Season 2 (2018–19)

Season 3 (2019–20)

Season 4 (2021)

Season 5 (2021–22)

Season 6 (2022–23)

Ratings

Season 1

Season 2

Season 3

Season 4

Season 5

Season 6

Explanatory notes

References

External links
 
 

9-1-1 (TV series)
Lists of American drama television series episodes